Charles Anderson Combined School is a non-boarding government combined school in the Oshana Region of Namibia, founded in 1999 and situated in Ongwediva. Graduates frequently occupy the national Grade 10 top ten.  The building of the school was funded by the Swedish government. The school is named after Charles John Andersson. The school teaches about 800 students from grade 1 to grade 10.

See also
 List of schools in Namibia
 Education in Namibia

References

Ongwediva
Schools in Oshana Region
1999 establishments in Namibia
Educational institutions established in 1999